Saint of the Pit is the fourth album by American avant-garde artist Diamanda Galás, released on 17 November 1986 by record label Mute.

Content 

Saint of the Pit is the second instalment of her "Masque of the Red Death" trilogy about the AIDS epidemic. In this instalment, she focuses on musical settings of poems by French Decadents.

Reception 

Trouser Press wrote "Galás' astonishingly varied singing styles and the hypnotic effect of the record's three claustrophobic, obsessive pieces makes Saint of the Pit a powerful document of suffering."

Track listing

Personnel
Musicians
F. M. Einheit – drums (B2), chains (A1)
Diamanda Galás – vocals, piano, Hammond organ, synthesizer, producer
Production and additional personnel
Gareth Jones – production
Paul Kendall – recording (A1)

Charts

Release history

References

External links 

 

Diamanda Galás albums
1986 albums
Albums produced by Gareth Jones (music producer)
Mute Records albums